Al-Zaeem Sport Club, is an Iraqi football team based in Al-Suwaira, Wasit, that plays in Iraq Division Two.

Naming
"Al-Zaeem", which means the leader, is the nickname given to the former Iraqi prime minister Abd al-Karim Qasim, hence the name of the club, and it is the first and most popular club in Wasit.

Managerial history
 Abdullah Salih
 Asaad Wadi

See also 
 2020–21 Iraq FA Cup
 2021–22 Iraq FA Cup

References

External links
 Al-Zaeem SC on Goalzz.com
 Iraq Clubs- Foundation Dates

2005 establishments in Iraq
Association football clubs established in 2005
Football clubs in Wasit